Bhikkhu Pāsādika (secular name: Eckhard Bangert), born August 17, 1939 at Bad Arolsen in Hesse, is a German indologist and a Buddhist monk. His Dharma or religious name Pāsādika is a Pali word meaning "amiable".

He entered the Buddhist order of the Theravāda tradition (Old School) in Thailand in 1960. He has been a member of the Buddhist Research Institute Linh-Son at Joinville-le-Pont (Paris) since 1978.

In October 2016, he became President of the Linh Son Buddhist Academy in Vitry-sur-Seine, France. Since October 2019 he lives permanently at this academy.

Biography

He speaks German, English, French and Thai, and studied Sanskrit, Pāli, Hindi, Chinese, Tibetan and Japanese. He received his academic education in India (Nālandā Pāli Institute in the early 1960s (M.A. from Magadh University in 1964), Punjabi University Patiala in the early 1970s (Ph.D. from Punjabi University in 1974)). From 1975-77 he was reader at Punjabi University Patiala, teaching Pāli and German. He edited the quarterly ''Linh-Són - publication d'études bouddhologiques at Joinville-le-Pont from 1978-82. Then, until 1993, he participated in the project Sanskrit Dictionary of the Buddhist Texts from the Turfan Finds of the Commission of Buddhist Studies, Academy of Sciences, Göttingen. From 1995-2007 he was hon. professor, Dept. of Indology and Tibetology of Philipp's University Marburg, teaching Pāli, Sanskrit, classical Tibetan and Buddhist Chinese. Additionally, he was in charge of the chair of Indology at Würzburg University (1996-2000). He also was visiting professor at Ruhr University Bochum (2000, 2002). He has been specializing in early Mahāyāna literature and Śrāvakayānist Nikāya-Āgama comparative studies.

Publications by Bh. Pāsādika

Translation from Thai/English: Siamesische Illustrationen der Buddhalehre, Erläuterungen zu einem traditionellen buddhistischen Manuskript aus Siam von Buddhadāsa Bhikkhu, Social Science Association Press of Thailand, Bangkok, 1968; Horst Erdmann Verlag, Tübingen, 1969

Excerpts from the Śūrańgama-Samādhi-Sūtra - in collaboration with Thubten Kalsang Rinpoche, World Fellowship of Buddhists, Bangkok, 1971; Bihar Research Society, Patna (2nd ed.), 1972; Library of Tibetan Works and Archives, Dharamsala (3rd ed.), 1975

  Vimalakīrtinirdeśasūtra, Tibetan Version, Sanskrit Retranslation (based on his Ph.D. dissertation), Hindi Translation - in collaboration with Lal Mani Joshi, Central Institute of Higher Tibetan Studies, Sarnath/Varanasi, 1981
 Kanonische Zitate im Abhidharmakośabhāṣya des Vasubandhu, Vandenhoeck & Ruprecht, Göttingen, 1989 
 Nāgārjuna's Sūtrasamuccaya, Critical Edition of the mDo kun las btus pa, Akademisk Forlag, Copenhagen, 1989
 Dharmadūta : mélanges offerts au Vénérable Thich Huyên-Vi à l'occasion de son soixante-dixième anniversaire - edited in collaboration  with Bhikkhu T. Dhammaratana, Éditions You-Feng, Paris, 1997

The Kāśyapaparivarta, Devanāgarī Edition and English Translation, Aditya Prakashan, New Delhi, 2015 (re. biographical details and short list of publications see back cover of this book - www.bibliaimpex.com )

For a complete list of his publications see:

 Pāsādikadānaṁ : Festschrift für Bhikkhu Pāsādika, ed. by M. Straube et al. , Indica et Tibetica 52, Marburg, 2009

External links

 « Laudatio durch Prof. em. Dr. Eckhard Bangert (Bhikkhu Pāsādika) »

1939 births
People from Bad Arolsen
Magadh University alumni
Converts to Buddhism
German Theravada Buddhists
German Buddhists
Academic staff of the University of Bergen
Academic staff of the University of Oslo
Academic staff of the University of Marburg
Academic staff of the University of Kassel
German expatriates in Thailand
German expatriates in France
German expatriates in India
German expatriates in Norway
Members of the Norwegian Academy of Science and Letters
Norwegian Buddhists
Living people